Hurdon is a suburb of New Plymouth, in the western North Island of New Zealand. It is located to the southwest of the city centre.

An early settler of the area was Peter Elliot, who arrived on the Amelia Thompson in 1841. He established the first dairy in New Plymouth, which he called Hurdon. A school was established in his barn in 1853.

Demographics

Hurdon had a population of 2,220 at the 2018 New Zealand census, an increase of 132 people (6.3%) since the 2013 census, and an increase of 369 people (19.9%) since the 2006 census. There were 870 households, comprising 1,062 males and 1,158 females, giving a sex ratio of 0.92 males per female. The median age was 42.1 years (compared with 37.4 years nationally), with 438 people (19.7%) aged under 15 years, 384 (17.3%) aged 15 to 29, 972 (43.8%) aged 30 to 64, and 429 (19.3%) aged 65 or older.

Ethnicities were 89.7% European/Pākehā, 12.0% Māori, 1.5% Pacific peoples, 4.6% Asian, and 1.6% other ethnicities. People may identify with more than one ethnicity.

The percentage of people born overseas was 17.7, compared with 27.1% nationally.

Although some people chose not to answer the census's question about religious affiliation, 46.9% had no religion, 40.9% were Christian, 0.3% had Māori religious beliefs, 0.7% were Hindu, 0.5% were Muslim, 0.4% were Buddhist and 1.8% had other religions.

Of those at least 15 years old, 363 (20.4%) people had a bachelor's or higher degree, and 321 (18.0%) people had no formal qualifications. The median income was $32,200, compared with $31,800 nationally. 312 people (17.5%) earned over $70,000 compared to 17.2% nationally. The employment status of those at least 15 was that 873 (49.0%) people were employed full-time, 285 (16.0%) were part-time, and 57 (3.2%) were unemployed.

Education
Frankley School is a coeducational contributing primary (years 1-6) school with a roll of  students as of  The school started as Frankley Road School in 1878. A new two-room school replaced it in 1910. The school moved to its current site in 1969.

Notes

External links
 Frankley School website

Suburbs of New Plymouth